Jang Hyun-soo (born 1 January 1993) is a South Korean footballer who plays for Iwate Grulla Morioka of J2 League.

External links
 
 

1993 births
Living people
Association football midfielders
South Korean footballers
South Korean expatriate sportspeople in Japan
Suwon Samsung Bluewings players
Busan IPark players
Bucheon FC 1995 players
Iwate Grulla Morioka players
K League 1 players
K League 2 players
J2 League players
Expatriate footballers in Japan